Born Fighter is an autobiographical book written by Reginald Kray.  In 1969 he and his twin brother Ronnie Kray received life sentences for the murders of George Cornell and Jack McVitie.  First published in London in 1990 in hardback by Century and paperback in 1991 by subsidiary Arrow Books.

Reggie Kray wrote several successful books while incarcerated in high security prison as a "Category A" prisoner for 30 years (of those, 18 years in Parkhurst Prison).  The book gives a first-hand account of Reggie's life as one half of the most notorious underworld gangsters in the 1950s and 1960.

Notes

External links
British Library (Integrated Catalogue)
1965: Krays in custody over menace charge
1968: Krays held on suspicion of murder
1969: Kray twins guilty of McVitie murder

1991 non-fiction books
Organized crime memoirs
Memoirs of imprisonment
Works about the Kray twins
Century (imprint) books